Lutraria is a genus of medium-sized marine bivalve mollusks or clams, commonly known as otter shells.

Characteristics
Members of this genus have large, elongated oval shells with two equal sized valves. The anterior end is somewhat sharply curved but the posterior end is more rounded. The valves gape slightly at both ends, more so at the posterior end. The shell is fairly thick and is sculptured with fine concentric lines corresponding to periods of growth. The basic colour is white and the periostracum is brown, but the latter is usually abraded. The interior surface of the valves is glossy white. The beaks are blunt and situated slightly closer to the anterior end. The ligament is small and largely internal. The foot is small and the siphons are long and are housed in a common horny sheath for most of their length.

Biology
As they grow they burrow deeper but are otherwise relatively sedentary.

Fossil record
Fossils of Lutraria are found in marine strata from the Eocene to the Quaternary (age range: from 33.9 to 0.0 million years ago.). Fossils are known from Europe, South Africa, Japan, New Zealand, Pakistan, Australia, India and Argentina.

Species

Lutraria angustior Philippi, 1844
Lutraria budkeri Nicklès, 1955
Lutraria capensis Reeve, 1854
Lutraria complanata (Gmelin, 1791)
Lutraria curta Reeve, 1854
Lutraria impar Reeve, 1854
Lutraria inhacaensis Boshoff, 1965
Lutraria lutraria (Linnaeus, 1758)
Lutraria maxima Jonas, 1844
Lutraria oblonga (Gmelin, 1791)
Lutraria rhynchaena Jonas, 1844
Lutraria senegalensis Gray, 1837
Lutraria sieboldii Reeve, 1854
Lutraria steynlussii Huber, 2010
Lutraria turneri Jousseaume, 1891

References

Mactridae
Bivalve genera
Taxa named by Jean-Baptiste Lamarck